Labbas is a lake in the Swedish municipality of Arjeplog near the village of Sundnäs close to the Arctic Circle. The lake stands at 488 meters above sea level. Locally, the lake is known for being a good fishing ground for char.

Astrid Lindgren used the name of the lake as a name in Ronia the Robber's Daughter after she found it on a road map.

References

Lakes of Norrbotten County